Potamonautes rukwanzi is a species of crustacean in the family Potamonautidae. It is endemic to Uganda. Its natural habitat is freshwater lakes.

Sources 

Potamoidea
Freshwater crustaceans of Africa
Arthropods of Uganda
Endemic fauna of Uganda
Taxonomy articles created by Polbot
Crustaceans described in 2000